Estadio do Futebol Clube de Vizela is a multi-use stadium in Caldas de Vizela, Portugal.  It is currently used mostly for football matches and is the home stadium of FC Vizela.  The stadium is able to hold 5,917 people.

Futebol Clube de Vizela
Sports venues in Braga District